Louis IV of Germany may refer to:
 Louis the Child, the last Carolingian king of Germany, or rather of East Franks
 Louis IV, Holy Roman Emperor